Unton is a surname occasionally as a first name most commonly found in the United States, Poland, Russia, United Kingdom and Belarus.

People with the surname Unton are;
Edward Unton (high sheriff) (1534–1582), English politician and high sheriff
Edward Unton (captain) (c. 1556–1589), English landowner and MP
Sir Henry Unton (c. 1557–1596), Elizabethan English diplomat
Henry Unton (MP) (c. 1535–1555 or later), English politician and high sheriff
Tomasz Unton (born 1970), Polish footballer and manager

People with the first name Unton are;
Unton Croke (1593–1671), English judge and politician